Seiden may refer to:

the RG Veda manga
SD Gundam Seiden

People with the surname
Esther Seiden (1908–2014), Polish-Israeli-American mathematical statistician
Frank Seiden (c.1861-1931), American Yiddish singer and magician
Joseph Seiden (1892–1974), director, producer of Yiddish films
Lewis Seiden (1934–2007), American pharmacologist
Rudolph A. Seiden (1900–1965), Austrian-American chemist
Celada-Seiden model
Al Seiden, American basketball player

German-language surnames